Dwijesh Kumar Dutta Majumder INSA (1932-2020) was a Professor Emeritus in the Computer and Communication Sciences Division of the Indian Statistical Institute, Kolkata and Honorary Director-Secretary of the Institute of Cybernetics Systems and Information Technology in the same city. He is also an Emeritus Scientist of the Council of Scientific & Industrial Research, operated by the Government of India.

Career 
Dwijesh Kumar Dutta Majumder obtained a BSc (Hons) in physics honors (1952) with a First Class First distinction from Guwahati University before studying at the Rajabazar Science College, University of Calcutta, where he was awarded an MSc (Tech.) in 1955 and a PhD in 1962-1963 in Radiophysics and Electronics.

Dutta Majumder worked for the Computer Development and Research Division of the Indian Statistical Institute (ISI) and there helped to develop magnetic memory systems and other digital electronic circuits. In particular, he had a role in building the first solid state transistorised computer in India, which was called ISI-JU-1.

In 1964, Dutta Majumder visited the University of Michigan, USA, to work with N. R. Scott on computer system design, pattern recognition and problems related to both computer and human memory, He was awarded a UNDP Fellowship for this purpose.

Upon his return to India after his post-doctoral fellowship in the United States, Dutta Majumder subsequently became Head of the Electronics and Communication Sciences Unit (ECSU), Professor-in-Charge of Physical & Earth Sciences Division, and Joint Secretary and Joint Director of ISI. Upon his retirement as the head of ECSU, he was honored to accept a Professor Emeritus position at the newly formed Knowledge-based Computer Systems (KBCS) division of ISI, which he helped build from the ground up. Dutta Majumder has published over 500 research papers and several books.

Honours & awards 
Dutta Majumder has received recognition for his work, including:
Norbert Wiener Award (1977)
IAPR Fellow (1994): First Indian fellow.
P. C. Mahalanobis Medal (1993)
J. L. Nehru Birth Centenary Lecture Award of INSA (1994)
Shri Om Prakash Bhasin Award (1996)
Frank George Research Award (1999)
Rathindra Purashkar from Viswa Bharathi University (2001)
Professor Jnan Chandra Ghosh Award from Bengal Science Association (2003)
Life-time Achievement Award from INAE (2004)
Norbert Wiener Award of Excellence from Western Oklahoma State College (WOSC) (2005)
National Vasvik Award (2008)

He has been elected as a Fellow of the Indian National Science Academy, the Indian National Academy of Engineering and the Academy of Sciences for the Developing World.

Bibliography

References

External links 

http://www.tandfonline.com/doi/abs/10.1080/03772063.1969.11485755
http://www.tandfonline.com/doi/abs/10.1080/03772063.1970.11486585
http://www.tandfonline.com/doi/abs/10.1080/03772063.1962.11486338
http://library.isical.ac.in:8080/jspui/bitstream/10263/899/1/IJOP-37-1-1963-P67-100.pdf

Living people
University of Calcutta alumni
Fellows of the Indian National Science Academy
Fellows of the Indian National Academy of Engineering
1932 births